The Tenth Federal Electoral District of Chihuahua (X Distrito Electoral Federal de Chihuahua) is a defunct Federal Electoral District of the Mexican state of Chihuahua.
It was in existence from 1979 to 1997 and returned one deputy to the Chamber of Deputies for each of the 51st to 56th Congresses.

It was centred on the city of Ciudad Cuauhtémoc, and covered the municipalities of
Cuauhtémoc, Cusihuiriachi, Dr. Belisario Domínguez, Gran Morelos, Guachochi, Nonoava, Riva Palacio, Rosales, Rosario, San Francisco de Borja, Satevó and Valle de Zaragoza.

Deputies returned to Congress from this district

LI Legislature
 1979–1982: Alfonso Jesús Armendáriz Durán (PRI)
LII Legislature
 1982–1985: Miguel Ángel Olea Enríquez (PRI)
LIII Legislature
 1985–1988: José Bernardo Ruiz Ceballos (PRI)
LIV Legislature
 1988–1991: Artemio Iglesias Miramontes (PRI)
LV Legislature
 1991–1994: Israel Beltrán Montes (PRI)
LVI Legislature
 1994–1997: Jorge Castillo Cabrera (PRI)

References and notes

Federal electoral districts of Mexico
Chihuahua (state)
Constituencies established in 1979
1979 establishments in Mexico
Constituencies disestablished in 1997
1997 disestablishments in Mexico